The northern barred woodcreeper (Dendrocolaptes sanctithomae) is a species of bird in the subfamily Dendrocolaptinae. It was formerly included as a subspecies of the Amazonian barred woodcreeper (D. certhia).

It is found from southern Mexico through Central America to Colombia, Venezuela and Ecuador.

References

northern barred woodcreeper
Birds of Central America
Birds of the Tumbes-Chocó-Magdalena
northern barred woodcreeper
Taxonomy articles created by Polbot